Luísa Hanae Matsushita (born February 25, 1984), known by her stage name Lovefoxxx, is the lead singer of the Brazilian indie band Cansei de Ser Sexy (CSS).

Early life and career

Lovefoxxx was born in Campinas, Brazil. She is of Portuguese, German and Japanese descent.

In May 2008, Lovefoxxx was on the cover of RG Vogue magazine.

In 2010, Lovefoxxx was featured on both French DJ Kavinsky's and Japanese band 80kidz's new singles, respectively known as "'Nightcall" and "Spoiled Boy". "Nightcall" was included in the soundtrack of the 2011 film Drive. She also took part in N.A.S.A.'s project The Spirit of Apollo, on a track called "A Volta". Lovefoxxx was featured on Steve Aoki's album Wonderland (2011), on a song titled "Heartbreaker", which was released as a single in early 2012.

Personal life

In 2006, Lovefoxxx was voted No. 10 in NME's Cool List. In 2007, Lovefoxxx was voted No. 3, only to be beaten by her fiancé's bandmate Jamie Reynolds, who came in second, and winner Frank Carter of Gallows.

Lovefoxxx does not have an official or public account on any social media - and she has vocalized her distaste for falsified accounts representing her via the official CSS blogspot.

Lovefoxx lives in Garopaba, a beach town on the southern coast of Santa Catarina, where she built an ecohouse by hand.

Simon Taylor-Davis
Lovefoxxx was previously dating Simon Taylor-Davis of Klaxons; according to an interview with ELLE UK they started their relationship on the second day of the NME Indie Rave tour, where their bands were billed together. Simon had said he first saw Luisa in a CSS video on television and sent her a "flirty myspace message" before they had met.  In June 2007, during the Cansei de Ser Sexy tour of North America, Lovefoxxx had Simon's name tattooed on her right hip.

On 21 September 2007, it was revealed that the two were engaged, with Lovefoxxx later saying that they would be married in the winter of that year. There was no news of an official wedding, with Simon later saying they had no definite plans though they had married "in cyberspace" through Skype. In late 2010, during promotion for Klaxons' second album, it was stated that the two had broken up, with Simon confirming that a major change for the band was "as individuals we are all single now, whereas before we were very heavily attached in various relationships"

References

External links

1984 births
Living people
Brazilian designers
Brazilian people of German descent
Brazilian musicians of Japanese descent
Brazilian people of Portuguese descent
English-language singers from Brazil
Women in electronic music
Women rock singers
People from Campinas
Musicians from São Paulo (state)
21st-century Brazilian women singers
CSS (band) members
21st-century Brazilian singers
Brazilian people of Japanese descent
Musicians from Santa Catarina (state)